Méry-Bissières-en-Auge (literally Méry Bissières in Auge) is a commune in the department of Calvados, northwestern France. The municipality was established on 1 January 2017 by merger of the former communes of Méry-Corbon (the seat) and Bissières.

See also 
Communes of the Calvados department

References 

Communes of Calvados (department)